Columbia, Missouri, held an election for mayor, on April 2, 2019. Incumbent mayor Brian Treece successfully won re-election against former Missouri House member Chris Kelly. Kelly's run for Columbia mayor was the only unsuccessful electoral campaign of his career.

Background 
Chris Kelly, a former Democratic member of the Missouri House of Representatives, had previously expressed interest in running for the city's highest office. On October 29, 2018, Kelly officially announced his candidacy for Columbia mayor.

Candidate petition filings for the municipal elections were open beginning October 30, 2018 and closed on January 8, 2019. Candidates running for mayor required the valid signatures of at least 100 registered Columbia voters. Both incumbent mayor Brian Treece and challenger Chris Kelly filed their petitions on October 30.

Campaign 
Chris Kelly attracted controversy early in the race following the revelation that he had deleted thousands of tweets from his Twitter account days before beginning his campaign. Screenshots of the messages were obtained by both Mayor Treece and the Columbia HeartBeat, with Treece describing the contents of the tweets as “misogynistic, racist, offensive and unacceptable." Kelly responded to the accusations by claiming that the tweets were either jokes or taken out of context, while also stating in an interview “I sometimes have said things that I should not have said, and there’s no excuse for them."

Polls

Results 
Brian Treece was re-elected mayor by a wide margin over Chris Kelly, winning the popular vote in 33 of the city's 35 precincts.

Aftermath 
On election night, Chris Kelly called Brian Treece to concede the race, with Treece delivering his victory speech shortly afterwards.

References 

Columbia
21st century in Columbia, Missouri
Columbia
Non-partisan elections
Mayoral elections in Columbia, Missouri